Hydrillodes gravatalis is a moth of the family Erebidae first described by Francis Walker in 1859. It is found in the Indian subregion, Sri Lanka and Sundaland.

Forewings blackish brown. Punctate submarginals are straw white. Caterpillars feed on detritus and pericarp of Shorea and Dipterocarpus species.

Gallery

References

Moths of Asia
Moths described in 1859
Herminiinae